Just Supposin' is the thirteenth album by Status Quo. Co-produced by the group and John Eden, it was recorded at Windmill Lane Studios, Dublin. Released on 17 October 1980, it entered the UK albums chart at number 4.

Three tracks were issued as singles the same year, "What You're Proposing", and a double A-side, "Lies"/"Don't Drive My Car". At the end of 1981 an edited version of another track, the uncharacteristic ballad "Rock 'n' Roll", appeared as a single after the release of Quo's subsequent album Never Too Late. It was a prolific recording session, which included enough material for Never Too Late, released only five months later.

"Over the Edge" was co-written by bass player Alan Lancaster and Keith Lamb, lead singer of British bands The Case, Sleepy Talk and Mr. Toad, and founder and lead singer of Australia's successful glam rock band Hush.

The cover art work features the launch phase of a UGM-84 Harpoon submarine missile.

Reception

In their retrospective review, AllMusic mostly praised the album's set of songs, commenting that they "married the expected boogie to a new wave quirkiness that was straight out of the year's hippest fashion guides. It works, as well – for the most part, anyway."

Track listing
Side one
 "What You're Proposing" (Francis Rossi, Bernie Frost) – 4:18
 "Run to Mummy" (Rossi, Andy Bown) – 3:12
 "Don't Drive My Car" (Rick Parfitt, Bown) – 4:32
 "Lies" (Rossi, Frost) – 3:56
 "Over the Edge" (Alan Lancaster, Keith Lamb) - 4:33

Side two
<li>"The Wild Ones" (Lancaster) – 4:02
<li>"Name of the Game" (Rossi, Lancaster, Bown) – 4:29
<li>"Coming and Going" (Parfitt, Bob Young) – 6:21
<li>"Rock 'n' Roll" (Rossi, Frost) – 5:23

2005 reissue bonus track
"AB Blues" (Rossi, Parfitt, Lancaster, John Coghlan, Bown) – 4:28

2017 double album deluxe edition reissue bonus tracks
Disc Two:
"AB Blues" – B-Side (Rossi, Parfitt, Lancaster, John Coghlan, Bown)
"Coming and Going" - Writing version 1980
"Don't Drive My Car" - Live - Le Mans 1981 *
"Over the Edge" - Live - Le Mans 1981 *
"Rock N Roll" - Live - Le Mans 1981 *
"Something 'bout You Baby I Like" - Live - Le Mans 1981 *
"What You're Proposing" - Live - Le Mans 1981 *

 denotes previously unreleased live track.

Personnel
Status Quo
Francis Rossi – guitar, vocals
Rick Parfitt – guitar, vocals
Alan Lancaster – bass, vocals
John Coghlan – drums
Additional personnel
Andy Bown – keyboards
Bernie Frost – backing vocals
Bob Young – harmonica on "Coming And Going"
Danny Clifford - photography

Chart positions

Weekly charts

Year-end charts

Certifications

References

1980 albums
Status Quo (band) albums
Vertigo Records albums